José Miguel Luna Hernández (6 September 1953 – 10 July 2017) was a Mexican politician affiliated with the Party of the Democratic Revolution. As of 2014 he served as Deputy of the LIX Legislature of the Mexican Congress representing Guanajuato.

References

1953 births
2017 deaths
Politicians from Guanajuato
Party of the Democratic Revolution politicians
Deputies of the LIX Legislature of Mexico
Members of the Chamber of Deputies (Mexico) for Guanajuato